The 13th Orenburg Red Banner Rocket Division (Military Unit Number 68545) is a military formation of the 31st Rocket Army, Strategic Missile Forces, located in Yasny, ZATO Komarovsky, Orenburg Oblast.

The deployment site for the division was chosen specifically for the location of the R-36 intercontinental ballistic missile.

History 
In 1964–1965 when the division began to form, the city of Yasny (transl: Clear) had not yet been formed. There was a small settlement builders of the future and Orenburgasbest. Next to it was district center Dombarovsky, where all mail, cargo, and so on were initially addressed. Therefore, in all the documents and V/Chs for the division it was written: Dombarovsky, Orenburg Oblast. A Military town divisions and the entire infrastructure were placed next to the plant under construction, as there was already a railway branch line, which greatly simplified all construction work. Over time, the village built up into the city of Yasny. Hence, some people get confused: either Dombarovsky or Yasny. Documents coming into the division sometimes have one and the other mailing address.

The SRF formation in Yasny began as Operation Group Dombarovskiy in May 1964. Headquarters 13th Rocket Division was formed in April 1965, as part of the 5th Independent Rocket Corps. However the division was quickly (within two months) transferred to the 18th Independent Rocket Corps, and then in 1970 to the 31st Rocket Army.
Major-General Dmitry Kharitonovich Chaplygin was the first division commander, from May 1964 until August 1970.

In 2004 the division gained the 'Orenburg' honorific.

References

This article has been created from the Russian wikipedia article at :ru:13-я ракетная дивизия

Rocket divisions of the Soviet Union
Rocket divisions of Russia
Military units and formations established in 1965